Hradište is a village and municipality in Partizánske District in the Trenčín Region of western Slovakia.

History
In historical records the village was first mentioned in 1533.

Geography
The municipality lies at an altitude of 215 metres and covers an area of 8.166 km². It has a population of about 1030 people.

Genealogical resources

The records for genealogical research are available at the state archive "Statny Archiv in Nitra, Slovakia"

 Roman Catholic church records (births/marriages/deaths): 1745-1942 (parish B)

See also
 List of municipalities and towns in Slovakia

References

External links
  Official page
https://web.archive.org/web/20070513023228/http://www.statistics.sk/mosmis/eng/run.html
Surnames of living people in Hradiste

Villages and municipalities in Partizánske District